Rafael Aparecido da Silva (born 26 May 1995), simply known as Rafael Silva, is a Brazilian footballer who plays for ABC, on loan from Vila Nova as a forward.

Career statistics

References

External links

1995 births
Living people
Brazilian footballers
Association football forwards
Campeonato Brasileiro Série B players
Campeonato Brasileiro Série C players
Luverdense Esporte Clube players
Vila Nova Futebol Clube players
Esporte Clube São Bento players
Mirassol Futebol Clube players
Esporte Clube Juventude players
Paraná Clube players
Clube Náutico Marcílio Dias players
ABC Futebol Clube players
Sportspeople from Goiânia